The 2011 Hamilton Tiger-Cats season was the 54th season for the team in the Canadian Football League and their 62nd overall. The Tiger-Cats finished 3rd place in the East Division with an 8–10 record. After hosting the East Semi-Final in 2009 and 2010 with no success, the Tiger-Cats had to go on the road for the 2011 playoffs since they finished 3rd in the East. In the East Semi-Final, the Ti-Cats upset the two-time defending Grey Cup champions, Montreal Alouettes, 52–44 in overtime, giving them their first playoff victory since 2001. The Ti-Cats then traveled to Winnipeg to play the Blue Bombers where they lost 19–3 in the East Final.

Offseason

CFL draft
The 2011 CFL Draft took place on Sunday, May 8, 2011. The Tiger-Cats had six selections in the draft with their first coming in the second round with the 10th pick overall. The team traded their first round pick, which was 5th overall, to Edmonton for two second round picks. With those picks, Hamilton selected the 10th ranked Moe Petrus from the University of Connecticut and quickly followed with Maurice Forbes of Concordia with the 13th overall pick.

Preseason

Regular season

Season standings

Season schedule

Roster

Coaching staff

Playoffs

Schedule

Playoff bracket

*-Team won in Overtime.

East Semi-Final

East Final

References

Hamilton Tiger-cats
Hamilton Tiger-Cats
Hamilton Tiger-Cats seasons